Mary C. Boys (born November 4, 1947), a member of the Sisters of the Holy Names of Jesus and Mary, is an American scholar specializing in religious studies. Currently, Boys is the Skinner and McAlpin Professor of Practical Theology at Union Theological Seminary in the City of New York. At Union, Boys served as the Dean of Academic Affairs for many years. She was formerly Professor of Religious Education at Boston College, where she served for 17 years.

Education
 Fort Wright College of the Holy Names in Spokane, WA, B.A. in Religion and Humanities, 1969
 Columbia University and Union Theological Seminary in the City of New York, M.A. 1975
 Columbia University and Union Theological Seminary in the City of New York, Ed.D. 1978
 Hebrew Union College-Jewish Institute of Religion, Doctor of Humane Letters, 2000
 Catholic Theological Union (Chicago, IL), Doctor of Theology, 2006
 The Jewish Theological Seminary of America, Doctor of Letters, 2011
 Gratz College, Doctor of Humane Letters, 2012

Biography
Mary Claire Boys was born in Seattle, Washington, to Ruth Wegner Boys and M.C. [Milford Charles] Boys. She grew up in the midst of the pre-Vatican II Catholic church. Living in Seattle she was immersed in conversations with friends across multiple faith traditions. The Second Vatican Council opened up new possibilities for leadership and action within the church, and Boys has noted that the Vatican II document Nostra Aetate, published in 1965, provided a crucial catalyst for her formation and imagination.

In August 1965 Boys joined a Roman Catholic women's religious order, the Sisters of the Holy Names of Jesus and Mary. In 1969 Boys completed a BA in Religion and Humanities at Fort Wright College of the Holy Names in Spokane, WA and began her teaching career as an instructor in Religion and in English at the Holy Names Academy in Spokane, WA. She made her final vows to the community in 1972.

Building on her vocation as an educator Boys moved to New York City to undertake the joint M.A. in Religion and Education at Columbia University and Union Theological Seminary, a degree she completed in 1975. Following that degree she entered their EdD program, and in 1978 she successfully defended her dissertation: "“Heilsgeschichte” as a hermeneutical principle in religious education," which was done under the mentorship of the late biblical scholar Raymond E. Brown and philosopher of education Dwayne Huebner.

From 1977 to 1994 she was on the faculty of Boston College, moving fluidly through the process from instructor to full professor. While there she wrote voluminously, garnering a reputation as the key Catholic scholar in the field of religious education who was engaging issues of Jewish/Christian understanding.

In 1994 she returned to her alma mater, Union Theological Seminary, as the Skinner and McAlpin Professor of Practical Theology, and in July 2013 she was installed as Dean of Academic Affairs at Union. She continues to hold both of these positions.

Significant Contributions to Religious Education

Boys began her research in the field of religious education by engaging historical critical biblical scholarship, which was only then beginning to have an impact in the Catholic context due to Vatican II. Her first book, Biblical Interpretation in Religious Education, was published by the Religious Education Press in 1980. In addition to numerous articles, chapters, and public lectures she became deeply involved with the Association of Professors and Researchers in Religious Education. That association led to her ground-breaking scholarly collaboration with Dr. Sara Lee in Christian-Jewish learning and dialogue.

Boys has made significant contributions to the field of religious education through her work on “learning in the presence of the other.” She has fundamentally reshaped not only Christian-Jewish dialogue, but also the scholarship of learning in multi-faith contexts across myriad traditions. The recipient of many large grants, she has been a senior advisor to several national projects, including the Valparaiso Project in the Education and Formation of Faith, the Catholic-Jewish Colloquium, Educating for Religious Particularism and Pluralism, and the ATS Project on Christian Hospitality and Interreligious Education.

Awards

Boys received the International Council of Christians and Jews Sir Sigmund Sternberg Award in 2005, the Eternal Light Award from the Center for Catholic-Jewish Studies at St. Leo University in 2012, the Ann O’Hara Graff award from the CTSA Women's Consultation on Constructive Theology in 2013, and the Shevet Achim Award in 2014 from the Council of Centers on Jewish-Christian Relations. She has honorary doctorates from four institutions, and has given endowed lectures at multiple colleges and universities, including the 1997 Madeleva Lecture at St. Mary's College, Notre Dame, IN, and The Cardinal Willebrands Lecture in Amsterdam, NL. She was a Luce Fellow in Theology from 2009 to 2010.

Books

Edited Books

References

External links
 Profile on the Union Theological Seminary website
 Profile at Scarboro Missions Site

Living people
Boston College faculty
Union Theological Seminary (New York City) faculty
1947 births
Women Christian theologians